Sparganothina is a genus of moths of the family Tortricidae.

Species
Sparganothina alta Landry, in Landry & Powell, 2001
Sparganothina amoebaea Walsingham, 1913
Sparganothina anopla Landry, in Landry & Powell, 2001
Sparganothina aurozodion Razowski & Wojtusiak, 2010
Sparganothina beckeri Landry, in Landry & Powell, 2001
Sparganothina cristata Landry, in Landry & Powell, 2001
Sparganothina cultrata Landry, in Landry & Powell, 2001
Sparganothina flava Razowski & Wojtusiak, 2006
Sparganothina hermosa Razowski & Wojtusiak, 2010
Sparganothina irregularis Landry, in Landry & Powell, 2001
Sparganothina lutea Landry, in Landry & Powell, 2001
Sparganothina nana Landry, in Landry & Powell, 2001
Sparganothina neoamoebaea Landry, in Landry & Powell, 2001
Sparganothina pollicis Landry, in Landry & Powell, 2001
Sparganothina refugiana Razowski & Wojtusiak, 2010
Sparganothina setosa Landry, in Landry & Powell, 2001
Sparganothina spinulosa Landry, in Landry & Powell, 2001
Sparganothina tena Landry, in Landry & Powell, 2001
Sparganothina ternaria Landry, in Landry & Powell, 2001
Sparganothina trispinosa Landry, in Landry & Powell, 2001
Sparganothina veracruzana Landry, in Landry & Powell, 2001
Sparganothina volcanica Landry, in Landry & Powell, 2001
Sparganothina xanthista Walsingham, 1913
Sparganothina xanthozodion Razowski & Wojtusiak, 2010

Placement uncertain
Sparganothina aureola Landry, in Landry & Powell, 2001
Sparganothina browni Landry, in Landry & Powell, 2001
Sparganothina costaricana Landry, in Landry & Powell, 2001
Sparganothina covelli Landry, in Landry & Powell, 2001
Sparganothina decagramma (Meyrick, 1932)
Sparganothina flammea Landry, in Landry & Powell, 2001
Sparganothina inbiana Landry, in Landry & Powell, 2001
Sparganothina laselvana Landry, in Landry & Powell, 2001
Sparganothina nephela (Walsingham, 1913)
Sparganothina venezolana Landry, in Landry & Powell, 2001

See also
List of Tortricidae genera

References

 , 1986: Synopsis of the classification of Neotropical Tortricinae, with descriptions of new genera and species (Lepidoptera: Tortricidae). Pan-Pacific Entomologist 62: 372–398.
 , 2010: Tortricidae (Lepidoptera) from Peru. Acta Zoologica Cracoviensia 53B (1-2): 73-159. . Full article: .
 , 2010: Some Tortricidae from the East Cordillera in Ecuador reared from larvae in Yanayacu Biological Station in Ecuador (Insecta: Lepidoptera). Genus 21 (4): 585–603. Full article: .

External links
tortricidae.com
tortricidae.com

Sparganothini
Tortricidae genera